Codo may refer to:

Codo, Aragon, a municipality in the province of Zaragoza, Aragon, Spain
Codó, a city in Maranhão, Brazil
"Codo", a 1983 single by the Austrian group DÖF